Aurélien Scholl (July 13, 1833 in Bordeaux April 16, 1902), was a French author and journalist.

He was successively editor of Le Voltaire and of L'Écho de Paris. He wrote largely for the theatre, as well as a number of novels dealing with Parisian life. He was included in the painting Music in the Tuileries, by Manet, as one of the flâneurs of the day.

Works
Lettres à Mon Domestique (1854)
L'Outrage (1867)
Fleurs d'Adultère (1880)
L'Orgie Parisienne (1883)
La Farce Politique (1887)
Les Ingénues de Paris (1893)
Denise (1894)
Tableaux Vivants (1896)
Les petits papiers. Comédie en un acte (1897)
L'esprit d'Aurelien Scholl (1925) edited by Léon Treich

References

1833 births
1902 deaths
Writers from Bordeaux
19th-century French novelists
French journalists
19th-century French dramatists and playwrights
French male novelists
19th-century French male writers
French male non-fiction writers
Date of death unknown